Knights of Space is a live album by Hawkwind recorded at their annual London Christmas gig at the Astoria on 19 December 2007 and released in August 2008. It is released as an audio (2xCD) and video (2xDVD)

Track listing
"Black Corridor" (Michael Moorcock)
"Aero Space Age Inferno" (Robert Calvert)
"Space Love" (Hawkwind)
"The Awakening" (Calvert)
"Orgone Accumulator" (Calvert, Dave Brock)
"Paradox" (Brock)
"Robot" (Calvert, Brock)
"Abducted" (Tree, Brock)
"Alien (I Am)" (Brock)
"Alien Poem" (Hawkwind)
"Master of the Universe" (Nik Turner, Brock)
"Time We Left" (Brock)
"Lighthouse" (Tim Blake)
"Arrival in Utopia" (Brock)
"Damnation Alley" (Calvert, Brock, Simon House)
"Sonic Attack" (Moorcock)
"Welcome to the Future" (Calvert)
"Flying Doctor" (Calvert, Brock)
"Silver Machine" (Calvert, Brock)

Personnel
Hawkwind
Dave Brock - guitar, keyboards, vocals
Tim Blake - keyboards, theremin 
Jason Stuart - keyboards
Mr. Dibs - bass guitar, vocals
Richard Chadwick - drums, vocals

Release history
May 2008: Vision Music - 2xCD
May 2008: Vision Music - 2xDVD

References
Vision Music

Hawkwind live albums
2008 live albums